In cricket, a batter reaches a century when he scores 100 runs or more in a single innings. A century is regarded as a landmark score for a batter, and his number of centuries is generally recorded in his career statistics. The Indian Premier League (IPL) is a professional league for Twenty20 cricket in India, which has been held annually since its first edition in 2008. In the fifteen seasons played so far, 74 centuries have been scored by 40 different batsmen out of which 20 are Indian players and the rest are overseas players. Players from eleven of the fifteen franchises have scored centuries, with the four franchises that have not had a player score a century for them being Pune Warriors India, Kochi Tuskers Kerala, Gujarat Lions & Gujarat Titans.

The first century in the IPL was scored in the first match on 18 April 2008 at M. Chinnaswamy Stadium, Bangalore by Brendon McCullum for Kolkata Knight Riders against Royal Challengers Bangalore. The highest score in the competition was made by Chris Gayle, who scored 175 runs not out for Royal Challengers Bangalore against Pune Warriors India. The fastest century in terms of strike rate was scored by Chris Gayle, who scored 100 runs in 30 balls while playing for Royal Challengers Bangalore. The slowest century was scored jointly by Manish Pandey for Royal Challengers Bangalore and Jos Butler for Rajasthan Royals. They reached the milestone in 67 balls. 31 centuries have come from 20 different Indian batsmen.

The highest number of centuries have been scored by Chris Gayle with 6 centuries, followed by Virat Kohli and Jos Buttler who have five centuries each to their name. David Warner, Shane Watson & K L Rahul have four centuries each. AB de Villiers & Sanju Samson have scored three centuries each, while Brendon McCullum, Adam Gilchrist, Virender Sehwag, Murali Vijay, Hashim Amla, Ajinkya Rahane, Shikhar Dhawan and Ben Stokes have scored two centuries each. Shikhar Dhawan and Jos Buttler are the only two players to have scored centuries in consecutive matches. Fifteen centuries have been made by the players of Royal Challengers Bangalore, which is more than any other team. Kolkata Knight Riders have conceded the highest number of centuries being 9, followed by the Mumbai Indians, Royal Challengers Bangalore and the Punjab Kings who have conceded eight centuries each.

The first part of this list includes all IPL centuries organised in a chronological order. The second part of the list provides an overview of centuries by IPL seasons, and the third part provides an overview of centuries by IPL teams. All statistics are correct as of 2 October 2021. Teams are initially listed in alphabetical order. The most centuries scored by an individual in a single season is 4, which was achieved by Virat Kohli in 2016 and Jos Buttler in 2022.

Key

Centuries

Season overview
2022 had the most overall centuries, i.e. 8, while only 2 centuries were scored in 2009.

Team overview
Punjab Kings has the most overall centurions, with 11 different players scoring centuries for them, while McCullum is Kolkata's only centurion. Brendon McCullum is the only players to register the highest score for multiple franchises.

See also
 Orange Cap
 List of Indian Premier League five-wicket hauls

Notes

References

Centuries
Lists of Indian cricket records and statistics
IPL
Indian Premier League lists